Udea exalbalis is a species of moth in the family Crambidae. It is found in Kazakhstan and Russia, where it has been recorded from the Tula region.

The forewings are yellowish and the hindwings are pure white without a pattern. Adults have been recorded from May to June.

References

Moths described in 1916
exalbalis